"The Wringer" is the seventeenth episode of the third series of the 1960s British spy-fi television series The Avengers, starring Patrick Macnee and Honor Blackman. It was originally broadcast by ABC on the ITV network on 18 January 1964. The episode was directed by Don Leaver and written by Martin Woodhouse.

Plot
Five British agents are eliminated in rapid succession on an Austrian "pipeline" escape route. Steed goes to investigate and finds himself wrongfully accused of betraying them.

Cast
 Patrick Macnee as John Steed
 Honor Blackman as Cathy Gale
 Peter Sallis as Hal Anderson 
 Paul Whitsun-Jones as Charles 
 Barry Letts as Oliver 
 Gerald Sim as Lovell 
 Terence Lodge  as The Wringer 
 Neil Robinson as Bethune 
 Douglas Cummings as Murdo

References

External links

Episode overview on The Avengers Forever! website

The Avengers (season 3) episodes
1964 British television episodes